Adam Jánošík (born September 7, 1992) is a Slovak professional ice hockey defenceman. He is currently playing with BK Mladá Boleslav of the Czech Extraliga (ELH). Jánošík was selected by the Tampa Bay Lightning in the 3rd round (72nd overall) of the 2010 NHL Entry Draft.

Jánošík made his Czech Extraliga debut playing with HC Bílí Tygři Liberec during the 2012–13 Czech Extraliga season. He made a brief move to the Slovak Extraliga spending the 2014–15 season with HC Košice before returning to Liberec.

On June 18, 2018, Jánošík moved to the KHL in securing a one-year contract with Slovak club, HC Slovan Bratislava, for the 2018–19 season.

Jánošík has a son with his partner Alexandra, who is the daughter of the MP Mária Šofranko.

Career statistics

Regular season and playoffs

International

References

External links

1992 births
Sportspeople from Spišská Nová Ves
Living people
Slovak ice hockey defencemen
Tampa Bay Lightning draft picks
HC Bílí Tygři Liberec players
Gatineau Olympiques players
HC Benátky nad Jizerou players
HC Košice players
Piráti Chomutov players
HC Slovan Bratislava players
HC Litvínov players
HC Plzeň players
IK Oskarshamn players
BK Mladá Boleslav players
Slovak expatriate ice hockey players in Canada
Slovak expatriate ice hockey players in Sweden
Slovak expatriate ice hockey players in the Czech Republic